Alain Milon (born 16 September 1947) is a member of the Senate of France, representing the Vaucluse department.  He is a member of The Republicans party.

References
Page on the Senate website

1947 births
Living people
Rally for France politicians
Union for a Popular Movement politicians
The Strong Right
French Senators of the Fifth Republic
Senators of Vaucluse
The Republicans (France) politicians